Last Day of Summer or The Last Day of Summer may refer to:

Film and television 
The Last Day of Summer (1958 film), a Polish film by Tadeusz Konwicki
The Last Day of Summer (2007 film), an American television film
Last Day of Summer (film), a 2009 American drama-comedy film
"Last Day of Summer" (Phineas and Ferb), a television episode

Music 
Last Day of Summer (Sons of Alpha Centauri and Treasure Cat album) or the title song, 2009
Last Day of Summer (White Denim album), 2010
Last Day of Summer (mixtape), by Summer Walker, 2018
"Last Day of Summer", a song by Magnet, 2003
"Last Day of Summer", a song by Skillet from the compilation Surfonic Water Revival, 1998
"Last Day of Summer", a song by Tommy Reilly from Hello! I'm Tommy Reilly, 2010
"The Last Day of Summer", a song by the Cure from Bloodflowers, 2000

Other uses 
The Last Day of Summer (book), a 1991 photo-book by Jock Sturges